The Puebla deer mouse (Peromyscus mekisturus) is a species of rodent in the family Cricetidae. It is found only in Mexico. Advanced studies have identified that P. mekisturus is a sister species of Reithrodontomys. The study used mitogenome phylogeny to identify the sister species of P. mekisturus.

References

Musser, G. G. and M. D. Carleton. (2005). Superfamily Muroidea. pp. 894–1531 in Mammal Species of the World a Taxonomic and Geographic Reference. D. E. Wilson and D. M. Reeder eds. Johns Hopkins University Press, Baltimore.
Castañeda-Rico, S., León-Paniagua, L., Edwards, C. W., & Maldonado, J. E. (2020). Ancient DNA From Museum Specimens and Next Generation Sequencing Help Resolve the Controversial Evolutionary History of the Critically Endangered Puebla Deer Mouse. Frontiers in Ecology and Evolution, 8. https://doi.org/10.3389/fevo.2020.00094

Peromyscus
Mammals described in 1898
Taxonomy articles created by Polbot
Taxa named by Clinton Hart Merriam